This article lists the squads for the 2018 Cyprus Women's Cup, the 11th edition of the Cyprus Women's Cup. The cup consisted of a series of friendly games, and was held in Cyprus from 28 February to 7 March 2018. The twelve national teams involved in the tournament registered a squad of 23 players.

The age listed for each player is on 28 February 2018, the first day of the tournament. The numbers of caps and goals listed for each player do not include any matches played after the start of tournament. The club listed is the club for which the player last played a competitive match prior to the tournament. The nationality for each club reflects the national association (not the league) to which the club is affiliated. A flag is included for coaches that are of a different nationality than their own national team.

Group A

Finland
Coach:  Anna Signeul

The squad was announced on 13 February 2018. Mimmi Nurmela was added to the squad on 20 February 2018. Linda Nyman replaced Tia Hälinen on 23 February 2018.

Italy
Coach: Milena Bertolini

The squad was announced on 19 February 2018.

Switzerland
Coach:  Martina Voss-Tecklenburg

The squad was announced on 13 February 2018.

Wales
Coach: Jayne Ludlow

The squad was announced on 13 February 2018.

Group B

Austria
Coach: Dominik Thalhammer

The squad was announced on 14 February 2018.

Belgium
Coach: Ives Serneels

The squad was announced on 15 February 2018.

Czech Republic
Coach: Karel Rada

The squad was announced on 13 February 2018. On 25 February 2018, Lucie Kladrubská replaced Petra Bertholdová.

Spain
Coach: Jorge Vilda

The squad was announced on 20 February 2018.

Group C

Hungary
Coach: Edina Markó

An initial 24-player squad was announced on 21 February 2018. A week later, on 28 February 2018, the final 23-player squad was announced, with Ágnes Nagy not travelling with the team to Cyprus.

North Korea
Coach: Kim Kwang-min

Slovakia
Coach: Ivan Hucko

The squad was announced on 20 February 2018.

South Africa
Coach: Desiree Ellis

The squad was announced on 2 February 2018. On 25 February 2018, Kholosa Biyana withdrew and was replaced by Zanele Nhlapo.

Player representation

By club
Clubs with 5 or more players represented are listed.

By club nationality

By club federation

By representatives of domestic league

References

2018